Frederick Theodore Underwood (October 14, 1868 – January 26, 1906) was a Major League Baseball pitcher during part of the 1894 season.  He was a native of St. Louis County, Missouri.

Underwood appeared in seven games for the Brooklyn Grooms of the National League, starting six of them and completing five. He gave up 110 baserunners (80 hits and 30 walks) in just 47 innings. He also gave up 62 runs, but only 41 of them were earned runs.

Despite his struggles he did win two games for Brooklyn...July 21 against the Philadelphia Phillies (8-7) and July 28 against the Washington Senators (9-5). He was more successful with the bat, as he went 7-for-18 for a batting average of .389.

In his short MLB career he was 2–4 with 10 strikeouts and an ERA of 7.85.

Underwood died at the age of 37 in Kansas City, Missouri.

External links
 Baseball Reference
 Retrosheet

Brooklyn Grooms players
Major League Baseball pitchers
Baseball players from St. Louis
19th-century baseball players
1868 births
1906 deaths
St. Paul Apostles players
Washington Senators (minor league) players
Rockford Hustlers players
Kansas City Blues (baseball) players
Birmingham Grays players
Birmingham Blues players
Mobile Bluebirds players
Rockford Forest City players
Rockford Reds players
Rockford Forest Citys (minor league) players
Detroit Tigers (Western League) players
Omaha Omahogs players
St. Joseph Saints players
Saginaw Braves players
Rockford Rough Riders players